Loscouët-sur-Meu (literally Loscouët on Meu) is a commune in the Côtes-d'Armor department of Brittany in northwestern France.

Geography
The River Meu flows southeast through the middle of the commune.

Population

Inhabitants of Loscouët-sur-Meu are called loscoetais in French.

See also
Communes of the Côtes-d'Armor department

References

Communes of Côtes-d'Armor